Jacob Coleman Hurewitz (November 11, 1914 – May 16, 2008) was an American political scientist

Hurewitz graduated from Trinity College in Hartford, Connecticut in 1936, then did his graduate work at Columbia, making what was then an unusual decision to concentrate on the Middle East. He worked for the Near East section of the Office of Strategic Services during World War II, then worked successively at the State Department, as a political adviser on Palestine to the President’s cabinet and for the United Nations secretariat. Professor Hurewitz began studying Middle Eastern politics in 1950, before the field had emerged as an academic discipline. From 1970 until 1984, Professor Hurewitz was director of the Columbia university's Middle East Institute, when he retired. In 1972, Hurewitz established the Columbia University Seminar on the Middle East, which he continued to chair until he was nearly 90.

His publications influenced many other historians. For example, Wm. Roger Louis wrote in his book "The British Empire in the Middle East, 1945–1951" (Clarendon, 1984) that "my views on Arab nationalism and Zionism, and on the United States and the Middle East, have been influenced by the sensitive and dead-on-the-mark observations of J. C. Hurewitz."

Hurewitz, died on May 16, 2008, of pneumonia. aged 93.

The Hoover Institution Archives hold fourteen boxes of his papers.

Books 
Soviet American Rivalry In The Middle East, New York Columbia Univ Press (1969), ASIN B0023XB3IA
The Struggle for Palestine, ACLS Humanities E-Book (2008), 
Soviet-American Rivalry in the middle East, Praeger for The Academy of Political Science (1972), ASIN B00128M7W8
Oil, the Arab-Israel Dispute, and the Industrial World, Columbia University, Westview Press, 
Persian Gulf: After Iran's Revolution, Foreign Policy Assn, 
Diplomacy in the Near and Middle East A Documentary Record: Volume 1, 1535 - 1914; Volume 2 1914 - 1956, D. Van Nostrand Company Inc. (1956), ASIN B000TLT4ES
The Middle East and North Africa in World Politics: A Documentary Record, Second Edition, Revised and Enlarged; Volume 2, British-French Supremacy, 1914–1945, Yale University Press (1979), 
Middle East Politics: The Military Dimension, Frederick A. Praeger (1969); Westview Press (1982), 
Middle East Dilemmas, Harper & Brothers (1953), 
Changing military perspectives in the Middle East, Rand Corp. (1970), ASIN B0006C9IIC
The road to partition: The Palestine problem, 1936–1948, Norton (1950), ASIN B0006ASFPQ

References 

1914 births
2008 deaths
Columbia University faculty
Trinity College (Connecticut) alumni
People of the Office of Strategic Services
Columbia University alumni
United States Army personnel of World War II
United States Army officers
Military personnel from Hartford, Connecticut
American orientalists
Deaths from pneumonia in New York City
Truman administration personnel
American officials of the United Nations